Armenian Woman's Sign Language, also known as Caucasian Sign Language or Harsneren ("bride's language"), is an indigenous sign language of Armenia. It is not directly related to the sign languages of Europe, though it may have historical connections to monastic sign language. It developed under marriage speech taboos similar to those operating in Aboriginal Australia (see Australian Aboriginal sign languages), and is now defunct.

Under the strict patriarchal society then existing in Armenia, a newly married woman was not allowed to speak in the presence of her husband, in-laws and certain other people. She could make simple communication using Harsneren. A study of the language took place in Tavush Province in the 1930s.

The deaf community now has its own sign language, known as Armenian Sign Language.

See also

 Armenian language
 Languages of Armenia
 List of sign languages

References

Languages of Armenia
Non-deaf sign languages

hr:Armenski znakovni jezik
pt:Língua gestual armeniana